The Black Book of Clark Ashton Smith is a transcription of a notebook that was kept by author Clark Ashton Smith.  It was released in 1979  by Arkham House in an edition of 2,588 copies.  The book was transcribed from Smith's notebook by Donald Sidney-Fryer and Robert A. ('Rah') Hoffman.  Appended to the transcription are two memoirs of Smith by George F. Haas.

Contents

The Black Book of Clark Ashton Smith contains the following:

 "Foreword", by Marvin R. Hiemstra
 The Black Book of Clark Ashton Smith
 "A Note on the Text"
 "Explanation of Editorial Devices"
 "Index by Title"
 "The Black Book of Clark Ashton Smith"
 "Excerpts from The Black Book"
 "Appendix of Finished Poems"
 "Song of the Necromancer"
 "Dominium in Excelsis"
 "Shapes in the Sunset"
 "Don Quixote on Market Street"
 "Soliloquy in an Ebon Tower"
 "The Isle of Saturn"
 "The Centaur"
 "Ye Shall Return"
 "Thebaid"
 "Appendix of Published Epigrams and Pensées"
 Two Memoirs of Smith by George F. Haas
 "As I Remember Klarkash-ton"
 "Memories of Klarkash-ton"

See also
 Clark Ashton Smith bibliography

Sources

1979 books
American poetry collections